The Party Animal is a 1984 comedy film written and directed by David Beaird. It was independently produced and was released across the United States, where it was critically derided, but did respectably well at the box office.

The film is a slapstick mockumentary-style comedy that spoofed the college campus sexploitation genre popularized by Animal House and Porky's. Though the movie was made on a shoestring budget, its soundtrack featured Buzzcocks, The Untouchables (who also perform in the film), The Fleshtones, The Convertables and Chelsea. The theme song for The Party Animal was "Why Can't I Touch It".

The film is available through MGM Home entertainment on a limited edition series of 80s comedies.

Plot
The film begins with the strains of "Why Can't I Touch It" by Buzzcocks as the camera pans across a rural landscape to the face of a beautiful teenage girl (Susanne Ashley) who is atop a hill surveying the road below. An open-ended truck rolls into view bearing a young man lying on a pile of turnips. This is Pondo Sinatra (Matthew Causey), the star of the story, a 22-year-old virgin burdened with raging hormones, no sex appeal or social skills. He is on his way to his first day at college. Upon arrival, Pondo cannot help but notice that the university is full of attractive and scantily clad females but try as he might he is of no interest to them. The good looking and popular 'Studly' (Timothy Carhart) soon takes him under his wing, as best friend and tries to teach him the ways of seduction but Pondo is without a clue and tries ever more bizarre schemes failing spectacularly with hilarious  consequences. Even the local whore house won't help him. Desperate to break what seems to be a curse, Pondo descends into suicidal depression at which point the college's wise janitor named Elbow (Jerry Jones) steps in and gives Pondo some advice in one of the film's most famous scenes. This and a few of the other main scenes are so politically incorrect they would not be allowed in today's more careful cinematic climate. The attempts include a try at poetic seduction. Studley tells Pondo what to say to his vivacious date Natasha (Robin Harlan) via a remote microphone; sending Pondo to buy elegant new clothes (he goes to the Punk store by mistake and leaves looking like Quasimodo); taking massive quantities of drugs (which in reality would be lethal); and activating world's biggest vibrator, the Moby-M5 with disastrous consequences. The M-5 episode provides a pretext for an outrageous scene where two porn store employees discuss strategic arms limitation treaties, using various dildos as props.

After one of these dating debacles, Pondo frightens Studley by shouting "I'd sell my soul for a piece of ass!" Meanwhile, the lovely Miranda, (Susanne Ashley), a mysterious girl with supernatural powers who has been observing Pondo's struggles for some time, hears his cry and cryptically acknowledges it. Some time afterward, Pondo accidentally creates a chemical compound that makes him irresistible to women. At first he revels in his new "party animal" prowess; later, exhausted and terrified, he takes to barricading himself in his room to escape the mobs of obsessed women who pursue him everywhere. "I have been greedy," he confesses despairingly to Studley, "I am like King Midas; everything I touch turns to poontang!" The end of the film is tragic-comic with a metaphysical twist concerning the fate of those ruled by lust.

Cast
Matthew Causey - Pondo Sinatra 
Timothy Carhart - Studly 
Jerry Jones - Elbow 
Susanne Ashley - Miranda/Mother Nature
Robin Harlan - Natasha 
Frank Galati - The Professor 
Luci Roucis - Sophia 
Joan Dykman - The Nurse 
Barbara Baylis - Madame 
Frannie James - Dean Fox
Leland Crooke - Dean's Secretary 
Billi Gordon - The New Dean

Soundtrack
The film contains numerous songs by The Fleshtones, Buzzcocks, Chelsea The Convertables.

References

External links

 

1984 films
1980s sex comedy films
1980s fantasy comedy films
American fantasy comedy films
American independent films
American sex comedy films
1984 directorial debut films
1980s English-language films
Films about potions
Films about virginity
Films directed by David Beaird
Films set in universities and colleges
Films shot in Illinois
1984 comedy films
1985 comedy films
1985 films
1980s American films